Cervoglenea lata is a species of beetle in the family Cerambycidae, and the only species in the genus Cervoglenea. It was described by Gressitt in 1951.

References

Desmiphorini
Beetles described in 1951